Lewis Phectic Haslett was an American inventor and the first person to receive a patent for an early form of the gas mask in 1849.

References

19th-century American inventors
Year of birth missing
Year of death missing